Mario Ilievski (born 24 February 2002) is a Macedonian professional football player who plays for Hungarian club Kisvárda.

Club career
Born in Skopje, Ilievski was playing in Macedonia for the youth team of Vardar until the summer of 2018 when at the age of 16 he made a move to Vardar Negorino, competing in the Macedonian Second Football League. He performed at Vardar Negotino for one season, and in October of 2019 he completed his first international transfer by signing for Septemvri Sofia, a club competing in the Second Bulgarian League. During the 2019–20 season the club loaned him back to Macedonia where he signed for GFK Tikvesh. Ilievski appeared on all 7 games for Tikvesh and scored 2 goals, but the season was cut short due to the corona pandemic. In July 2020 he returned to Septemvri and played for 2 more years, collecting a total of 68 caps and 29 goals for his club, stats which on 12 July 2022 secured him a transfer to Hungarian club Kisvárda competing in the top Hunarian football division Nemzeti Bajnokság I.

International career
He has been a regular member of Macedonian U-19 and U-21 national teams, where he also served as captain in few occasions.

References

External links
 
 

2002 births
Living people
Sportspeople from Skopje
Albanian footballers from North Macedonia
Association football forwards
Macedonian footballers
North Macedonia under-21 international footballers
North Macedonia youth international footballers
Kisvárda FC players
Macedonian First Football League players
Nemzeti Bajnokság I players
Second Professional Football League (Bulgaria) players
Macedonian expatriate footballers
Macedonian expatriate sportspeople in Hungary
Expatriate footballers in Hungary
Macedonian expatriate sportspeople in Bulgaria
Expatriate footballers in Bulgaria